Sheldon Lennard "Shelly" Novack (January 10, 1944 – May 27, 1978) was an American college and professional football offensive end, who was selected by the San Diego Chargers in the 15th round (135th pick overall) of the 1966 American Football League draft. After his retirement as a football player, Novack became an actor in both television and film.

Football career

Scholastic football
Novack was an all-league and special mention Junior College All-American at Santa Monica City College (class of 1963), and first-team All-American at Long Beach State in 1964 and 1965.

Professional football
In November 1965, Novack was drafted as a wide receiver by the American Football League (AFL) San Diego Chargers. He was the 135th pick in the 1966 AFL draft, but never played in a regular season game.

After two seasons in San Diego, Novack met Universal Studios acting coach Vincent Chase while playing in a touch football league during the offseason. Chase invited Novack to a meeting at the studios, which led to Novack embarking on an acting career.

Acting career
In 1968, Novack made his screen debut in the Hallmark Hall of Fame television film A Punt, a Pass, and a Prayer. He went on to appear in guest roles on television shows such as  Ironside, Police Story, The Streets of San Francisco, Quincy, M.E., The Virginian and The Love Boat.

Novack was a regular on the Quinn Martin-produced TV shows The F.B.I. (1973–74) and Most Wanted. In addition to television, he performed in a few theatrical film releases, including Johnny Finney in 1969's Tell Them Willie Boy Is Here; and Rolling, the cockpit mechanic who assists in moving the stranded jet, in 1970's Airport.

In 1977, Novack won the very first Toyota Grand Prix pro-celebrity race.

Death
On May 27, 1978, Novack died of a heart attack in Santa Monica, California at age 34. He is interred in the Hillside Memorial Park Cemetery in Culver City, California.

Filmography

References

External links

1944 births
1978 deaths
Male actors from Los Angeles
American male film actors
American football wide receivers
American male television actors
California State University, Long Beach alumni
Jewish American male actors
San Diego Chargers players
Santa Monica College alumni
Burials at Hillside Memorial Park Cemetery
20th-century American male actors
Players of American football from Los Angeles
20th-century American Jews